Viting is a community in Tamale Metropolitan District in the Northern Region of Ghana. It is located on the Tamale- Yendi or Salaga road, few meters after the Tamale Teaching Hospital. Viting is one of the main communities in the Tamale South Constituency.

Key Landmarks 

 Vitting Senior High Technical School
 Abubakari Sadiq Senior High School
 Sabonkudi Estates
 Ganaa Hotel
 Al-Saadi Senior High School
 Anabriya Senior High School
 Viting Dam

See also
Suburbs of Tamale (Ghana) metropolis

References 

Communities in Ghana
Suburbs of Tamale, Ghana